The 2021–22 Northern Iowa Panthers men's basketball team represented the University of Northern Iowa during the 2021–22 NCAA Division I men's basketball season. The Panthers, led by 16th-year head coach Ben Jacobson, played their home games at the McLeod Center in Cedar Falls, Iowa as members of the Missouri Valley Conference.

With a win over Loyola on February 26, 2022, the Panthers won the regular season MVC championship. They finished the regular season 18–10, 14–4 in MVC play to finish in first place. They defeated  Illinois State in the quarterfinals of the MVC tournament before losing in the semifinals to Loyola. As a No. 1 seed who didn’t win their conference tournament, they received an automatic bid to the National Invitation Tournament where they defeated Saint Louis in the first round before losing in the second round to BYU.

Previous season
In a season limited due to the ongoing COVID-19 pandemic, the Panthers finished the 2020–21 season 10–15, 7–11 in MVC play to finish in a three-way tie for fifth place. Former MVC Player of the Year and first-team all-MVC star A. J. Green played in only three games before he underwent hip surgery and missed the remainder of the season.
 
As the No. 7 seed in the MVC tournament, the Panthers defeated Illinois State in the first round. However, they were forced to forfeit their quarterfinal game against Drake due to a positive COVID test and subsequent contact tracing within the UNI program.

Offseason

Departures

2021 recruiting class

2022 recruiting class

Roster

Schedule and results

|-
!colspan=9 style=| Regular season

|-
!colspan=12 style=| MVC tournament

|-
!colspan=12 style=| NIT

Source

References

Northern Iowa Panthers men's basketball seasons
Northern Iowa
Panth
Panth
Northern Iowa